Brickellia lemmonii, or Lemmon's brickellbush, is a North American species of flowering plants in the family Asteraceae. It is native to northeastern and north-central Mexico (Chihuahua, Coahuila) and the southwestern United States (southern New Mexico, southeastern Arizona, western Texas).

Brickellia lemmonii is a shrub up to 50 cm (20 inches) tall. It produces many small flower heads with  pale yellow-green disc florets but no ray florets.

The species is named for John Gill Lemmon (1831–1908), husband of American botanist Sara Plummer Lemmon (1836–1923).

Varieties
 Brickellia lemmonii var. conduplicata (B.L.Rob.) B.L.Turner - New Mexico, Texas, Chihuahua, Coahuila
 Brickellia lemmonii var. lemmonii - Arizona, New Mexico, Texas, Chihuahua, Coahuila

References

lemmonii
Flora of Mexico
Flora of the Southwestern United States
Plants described in 1882